The discography of the English rock group Pink Floyd consists of 15 studio albums, four live albums, 12 compilation albums, five box sets, three EPs, and 27 singles. Formed in 1965, Pink Floyd earned recognition for their psychedelic or space rock music, and, later, their progressive rock music. The group have sold over 250 million records worldwide, including 75 million in the United States.

Pink Floyd achieved success in London's underground music scene, led by the singer and guitarist Syd Barrett. They signed a management deal with Peter Jenner and Andrew King (Blackhill Enterprises) in October 1966, and recorded a demo shortly afterwards to attract record label interest. In 1967, they signed with EMI Columbia and released their first single, "Arnold Layne", followed by the album The Piper at the Gates of Dawn.

Barrett left following mental health problems in 1968, and was replaced by the singer and guitarist David Gilmour. Both appear on Pink Floyd's second album, A Saucerful of Secrets, the first of several to feature cover artwork by Hipgnosis. In 1969, Pink Floyd released a soundtrack album (More) and a combined live and studio album, Ummagumma. Atom Heart Mother (1970) was a collaboration with Ron Geesin, featuring an orchestra and choir. Meddle and the Obscured by Clouds soundtrack followed in 1971 and 1972.

Pink Floyd's eighth album, The Dark Side of the Moon (1973), sold more than 30 million copies and is one of the best-selling albums. It has been reissued as a Quadrophonic LP and 5.1 surround sound Super Audio CD. The Dark Side of the Moon was followed by Wish You Were Here (1975), Animals (1977), and The Wall (1979); all except Animals reached number one in the US, and The Wall is the highest-certified multiple-disc album by the Recording Industry Association of America. Pink Floyd released few singles after Barrett's departure, though "Money" was a US top-20 hit, and "Another Brick in the Wall, Part 2" reached number one in the UK and US.

The bassist and singer Roger Waters became Pink Floyd's dominant force from the mid-1970s. He departed in 1985, declaring Pink Floyd "a spent force", and unsuccessfully sued to dissolve their partnership and retire the name. The remaining members, led by Gilmour, continued recording and touring as Pink Floyd, releasing A Momentary Lapse of Reason (1987), The Division Bell (1994) and The Endless River (2014).

In 2010, Pink Floyd sued EMI for unpaid royalties payments and for publishing their back catalogue on streaming services without their consent. A settlement was reached the following year, with the publication of the individual tracks on iTunes, and re-releases of The Dark Side of the Moon, Wish You Were Here and The Wall. In 2016, Pink Floyd established a record label, Pink Floyd Records, and launched an extensive reissue programme of their work on vinyl, and a box set The Early Years 1965–1972 containing a significant amount of previously unreleased material. In 2022, they released a one-off single, "Hey, Hey, Rise Up!", featuring the Ukrainian artist Andriy Khlyvnyuk, in protest of Russia's invasion of Ukraine.

Artwork
Most Pink Floyd covers do not feature the band members, and many do not feature the band name or any text. Waters recommended Hipgnosis for A Saucerful of Secrets cover, for which they were paid £110, and they went on to create many of the group's album packages. Ummagumma was the last to feature the group on the front cover, with a Droste effect created by multiple photographs, and a breakdown of their musical equipment on the back. Atom Heart Mother features a Friesian cow (named Lulubelle III) on the front cover, deliberately chosen as a reaction against the group's psychedelic image.

The cover of The Dark Side of the Moon was designed by Hipgnosis in collaboration with graphic designer George Hardie, and features a line drawing of light being refracted in a prism. The inner sleeve shows the graphic of a heartbeat, which can be heard at the start of the album. The original packaging also included additional posters and stickers. It has become one of the most recognisable rock album covers. The cover of Animals features an inflatable pig moored to Battersea Power Station that broke free and drifted into airspace. The Wall features a minimalist design on the front cover, while the inside sleeve shows cartoons of the principal characters in the story, both created by Gerald Scarfe. Hipgnosis' Storm Thorgerson returned to produce the cover for A Momentary Lapse of Reason, which featured a row of beds on Saunton Sands.

The CD packaging of the live album Pulse included a light emitting diode on the spine, powered by batteries. This gave a visual "pulse" when the CD was stored on a shelf, with the battery expected to last up to a year. The compilation Echoes: The Best of Pink Floyd features a composite piece of artwork created by Hipgnosis combining several past album covers.

Albums

Studio albums

Live albums

Compilation albums
Pink Floyd rarely appeared on multi-artist compilations, because they believed doing so would cheapen their work as a whole.

Box sets

EPs

Singles

Promotional singles

Notes:

Other charted and certified songs

See also
 Pink Floyd videography
 Pink Floyd bootleg recordings
 List of unreleased songs recorded by Pink Floyd

Notes

References
Citations

Sources

External links
 
 Pink Floyd at AllMusic
 
 
 Entries at 45cat.com

Discography
Discographies of British artists
Rock music group discographies